Suzanne Noreen Cato (born 20 June 1968) is an Australian-born New Zealand children's entertainer.  She is best known as the host of several New Zealand children's television programmes, most notably Suzy's World and You and Me.

Career 
Cato began her broadcasting career at the KCCFM radio station in Whangarei, before she moved to Auckland to begin her television career in 1990. Cato's first role on television was as a presenter of the New Zealand version of the popular children's television series The Early Bird Show with a puppet character named Russell Rooster. After The Early Bird Show, Cato moved on to hosting the children's television show 3pm.

In 1993 Cato presented the successful You and Me television show, which aired over 2000 episodes. When this show finished in 1998, Cato created her own production company – Treehut. Cato went on to produce her immensely popular Suzy's World, which aired 263 episodes from 1999–2002.

Since 2005, Cato has produced a television show in association with the New Zealand Police – Bryan and Bobby. Bryan and Bobby is an educational show which was created to teach children safety messages through song and entertainment.

Cato was a contestant on the seventh series of Dancing With The Stars New Zealand.

She is currently co-hosting a podcast series Double Strength Mama Power (regarding parenting in New Zealand) alongside Tui Fleming.

She will be part of a TV channel designed to educate New Zealand children stuck at home during the COVID-19 pandemic, on one of two channels announced on 8 April 2020.

On 9 May 2021 Suzy appeared on The Masked Singer NZ as the "Tui", being the first one eliminated.

Personal life 
Born in Brisbane, Queensland, Australia to New Zealand parents, Cato moved to her parents' homeland when she was a month old, living in Hamilton, Kaikohe and Dunedin before settling in Auckland where she lives today.

When Suzy's World was cancelled, Cato said that she was taking a break to focus on "her greatest production ever — growing a wee family"

Cato and her husband Steve have two children.

See also
 List of New Zealand television personalities

References

External links
Official website

1968 births
Living people
People from Brisbane
Australian emigrants to New Zealand
New Zealand television presenters
New Zealand women television presenters
People from Kaikohe
People from Auckland
Association of Community Access Broadcasters
Rhema Media